"Survive" is a song and single written by David Bowie and Reeves Gabrels for the album Hours in 1999. "Survive" was released as the third single from the album in January 2000, it reached number 28 on the UK Singles Chart. It was characterized as a confessional highlight in a review by Rolling Stone.

Bowie explained that "There was a time in my life when I was desperately in love with a girl, and I met her as it happens, quite a number of years later. And boy was the flame dead! So in this case on the album the guy's thinking about a girl he knew many years ago, and she was 'the great mistake he never made'"

There is a music video for this song, containing a green background and features objects floating including an egg, a table, Bowie himself and his chair, and eventually retreat back to their positions.

Track listing

UK CD version 1
 "Survive (Marius De Vries mix)" - 4:18
 "Survive (Album version)" - 4:11
 "The Pretty Things Are Going to Hell" (Stigmata soundtrack version)

This version also includes the full length "Survive" video in QuickTime format.

UK CD version 2
 "Survive (live)" - 4:11
 "Thursday's Child (live)" - 5:37
 "Seven (live)" - 4:06
This version also includes a full length video in QuickTime format of the live version of "Survive". All tracks are from the Paris Elysée Montmartre show on October 13, 1999.

International CD version 1
 "Survive (Marius De Vries mix)" - 4:18
 "Survive (Album version)" - 4:11

International CD version 2
 "Survive (Marius De Vries mix)" - 4:18
 "Survive (Album version)" - 4:11
 "Thursday's Child (live)" - 5:37
 "Seven (live)" - 4:06

A promo version and a 7" vinyl version with the same track list as the "International CD version 1" was also released.

Production credits
 Producers
 David Bowie
 Reeves Gabrels

 Mixed by:
 Mark Plati
Musicians:
David Bowie: vocals, Keyboards, 12 string acoustic guitar, Roland 707 drum programming.
Reeves Gabrels: Electric guitar and acoustic 6 and 12 string guitars, Drum loops and programming, synth.
Mark Plati: Bass guitar, Acoustic & electric 12 string guitar, Synth and drum programming, Mellotron
Mike Levesque: drums
Brendan Gallagher: Guitar on "Marius De Vries mix".

Live versions
 A live version recorded at the BBC Radio Theatre in London, June 27, 2000, was released on the live bonus disc that followed the first released of Bowie at the Beeb.

Other releases
 The "Marius De Vries mix" was released on the bonus disc that followed the 2004 reissue of  'hours...' .

Charts

References

1999 songs
2000 singles
David Bowie songs
Songs written by David Bowie
Songs written by Reeves Gabrels